C. monspeliensis may refer to:
 Cistus monspeliensis, the Montpelier cistus, a plant species native to southern Europe and northern Africa
 Coris monspeliensis, a plant species

See also